Padua’s fourteenth-century fresco cycles is a UNESCO World Heritage Site in Padua, Italy, listed in 2021. 

The site comprises eight buildings, both religious and secular, in four clusters. They house fresco cycles that were painted between 1302 and 1397 by several prominent painters: Giotto, Guariento di Arpo, Giusto de' Menabuoi, Altichiero da Zevio, Jacopo d'Avanzi, and Jacopo da Verona. The frescos are innovative in their way of depicting the allegorical narrative and use new way of perspective. Emotions of characters are shown in a realistic manner. In some frescos, the patron who commissioned them is depicted as one of the characters in a story. This new fresco style formed the inspirational basis for centuries of fresco work in the Italian Renaissance and beyond.

List of the sites

The World Heritage Site comprises four clusters:

References 

World Heritage Sites in Italy
Padua
Fresco paintings in Veneto